Car Nicobar Air Force Base  is located in IAF Camp village, on Car Nicobar Island in the Union territory of the Andaman and Nicobar Islands, India.

History
The  bitumen runway was built by the Japanese during their occupation of these islands between 1942 and 1945. After 1945, it was used by the British Royal Air Force as a refuelling base for regular (generally twice-weekly) flights between RAF Negombo (now Colombo International Airport) in Sri Lanka (then Ceylon) and RAF Changi in Singapore (& vice versa), with an additional stop in RAF Butterworth, on the Malayan peninsula (opposite Penang). These flights were generally operated by Vickers Valetta twin-prop aircraft. The first Mi-8 helicopter arrived here in 1982. Besides the No. 122 Helicopter Flight, IAF of Mi-8 helicopters, Dorniers and an Air Defence unit are based here.

The airstrip was brought into operation by the IAF by raising Staging Post in the year 1956, with its role as refuelling station for all aircraft flying across the Bay of Bengal. The Helicopter Flight was later inducted on 1 April 1985. The Base was upgraded to Forward Base Support Units (FBSU) on 23 August 1986 and subsequently as a Wing on 15 September 1993.
The air base was devastated by the 2004 Indian Ocean earthquake and tsunami, when 116 IAF officers and men, and wives and children, died. Little remained of the air base, which was established as India's southernmost defence post. IAF personnel worked night and day: the runway was repaired, navigational aids and the basic infrastructure were put back in place. On 14 April, just three-and-a-half months later, the Car Nicobar Air Base resumed operations.

Structure

Commercial services 
The Andaman & Nicobar Islands Administration operates biweekly flights between Port Blair and Campbell Bay via Car Nicobar with 10 seater D228 aircraft chartered from Indian Air Force. There's also regular helicopter service by Pawan Hans between Car Nicobar, Port Blair and various Islands of Nicobar district.

References

Carnicobar (Iaf)
Code:	VOCX*
IATA Code:	CBD
Lat,Lon:	9.1525,92.8196
State:	India
Elevation:	5
City:	Iaf Camp
FIR:	VOMF
Schedule:	No

Airports in the Andaman and Nicobar Islands
Indian Air Force bases
World War II sites in India
1940s establishments in India
Airports established in the 1940s
20th-century architecture in India